Tropidophorus brookei, also known commonly as Brook's keeled skink and Brooke's keeled skink,  is a species of lizard in the family Scincidae. The species is endemic to the island of Borneo.

Etymology
The specific name, brookei, is in honor of British adventurer James Brooke, who became the first White Rajah of Sarawak.

Geographic range
T. brookei is found in all main administrative divisions of the island of Borneo: Kalimantan (Indonesia), Sabah and Sarawak (Malaysia), and Brunei.

Habitat

Reproduction
T. brookei is viviparous.

References

Further reading
Boulenger GA (1887). Catalogue of the Lizards in the British Museum (Natural History). Second Edition. Volume III. ... Scincidæ .... London: Trustees of the British Museum (Natural History). (Taylor and Francis, printers). xii + 575 pp. + Plates I–XL. ("Tropidophorus brookii [sic]", new combination, p. 361 + Plate XXX, figures 1, 1a, 1b).
Gray JE (1845). Catalogue of the Specimens of Lizards in the Collection of the British Museum. London: Trustees of the British Museum. (Edward Newman, printer). xxviii + 289 pp. (Norbea brookei, new species, p. 102).

brookei
Endemic fauna of Borneo
Reptiles of Brunei
Reptiles of Indonesia
Reptiles of Malaysia
Reptiles described in 1845
Taxa named by John Edward Gray
Reptiles of Borneo